Cross Green is an area in the east of Otley, England, and the location of a multi-use sports stadium. The stadium is currently used mostly for rugby union matches and is the home ground of Otley R.U.F.C. It is on the eastern edge of the town, off Pool Road and is close to the new Asda supermarket. Otley RUFC has its own car park.

Cross Green is also the home of Otley Cricket Club, the ground lies to the side of the rugby field.

Otley Athletics and Otley Badminton Club are also based at Cross Green.

Cross Green was the site for the famous victory of the North of England over the All Blacks in 1979 and again in 1988 when the Wallabies were the victims of a North victory. The ground was used as a venue in the 1991 Rugby World Cup when it was held in England, hosting United States versus Italy. As the stadium has a capacity of only 5,000 people, it was the smallest venue in the 1991 cup.

Cross Green is the host venue for Music Festival LS21 Live! which is a summer festival organized by GeHo Events. Sheffield band The Reverend and the Makers were the 2013 Headline Act.

References

Rugby union stadiums in England
Rugby World Cup stadiums
Sports venues in Leeds
Otley